Vasanbhai Ahir is a member of Gujarat Legislative Assembly from Anjar constituency for 13th assembly since December 2012 and 2017. He formerly represented Bhuj constituency in 12th assembly from 2007 to 2012.

He started his political career right from the grass root level of Indian democracy that is Gram Panchayat. He was elected as Sarpanch of Ratnal (a village between Anjar and Bhuj in Kutch district).

References

Living people
Gujarat MLAs 2012–2017
Politicians from Kutch district
Bharatiya Janata Party politicians from Gujarat
Gujarat MLAs 2017–2022
Gujarati people
Year of birth missing (living people)
Gujarat politicians